Mniszew  is a village in the administrative district of Gmina Magnuszew, within Kozienice County, Masovian Voivodeship, in east-central Poland.

The village has an approximate population of 500.

References

Mniszew
Masovian Voivodeship (1526–1795)
Radom Governorate
Kielce Voivodeship (1919–1939)